Michel Ray de Carvalho (born in Gerrards Cross, Buckinghamshire, on 21 July 1944) is a British financier, former Olympic skier and luger, and former child actor in films such as The Brave One, The Tin Star, and Lawrence of Arabia (under the name Michel Ray).

Early life 
De Carvalho's father was a Brazilian diplomat and his mother was British.

He appeared in several films as a child and teenager, including the 1962 epic film Lawrence of Arabia (where he played the character Farraj), The Divided Heart in 1954 and The Brave One in 1956 where he plays a young Mexican boy who tries to rescue his pet bull from being killed by a champion bullfighter.

He quit acting to attend Harvard University, which he later described as "just about the most stupid decision" he ever made. Nevertheless, de Carvalho graduated from Harvard and then earned an MBA degree from the same university.

De Carvalho represented Great Britain at the 1968 Winter Olympics in skiing, and luge at the 1972 and 1976 Winter Olympics. In May 2013 he was named President of British Skeleton.

Career 
De Carvalho was the vice-chairman of investment banking at Citigroup, where he chaired Citi Private Bank in the EMEA (Europe, Middle East and Africa) region, a post to which he was appointed in November 2009.

He worked previously at HBS, Credit Suisse and Nikko Securities.

On 23 April 2015 he became the Executive Director at Heineken Holding N.V., but remains active as board member or director of several other business ventures.

In 2018 Carvalho was appointed chairman of CapGen.

Personal life 
He married Heineken heiress Charlene de Carvalho-Heineken in 1983. In 2002 Charlene inherited a fortune of 3 billion ($4.8bn) upon the death of her father, Freddy Heineken. They have five children (two sons and three daughters, including twins, born between 1984 and 1991).

Partial filmography
 The Divided Heart (1954) - Toni
 The Brave One (1956) - Leonardo
 The Tin Star (1957) - Kip Mayfield
 Flood Tide (1957) - David Gordon
 The Space Children (1958) - Bud Brewster
 Lawrence of Arabia (1962) - Farraj

References

Bibliography 
 Holmstrom, John. The Moving Picture Boy: An International Encyclopaedia from 1895 to 1995, Norwich, Michael Russell, 1996, p. 248.

Living people
1944 births
Olympic lugers of Great Britain
British male lugers
British people of Brazilian descent
Alpine skiers at the 1968 Winter Olympics
Lugers at the 1972 Winter Olympics
Lugers at the 1976 Winter Olympics
British male alpine skiers
Olympic alpine skiers of Great Britain
N M Rothschild & Sons people
Harvard Business School alumni